The Icelandic Children's Book Prize (Íslensku barnabókaverðlaunin) is a literary prize which is awarded annually (when sufficiently good entries present themselves) by the Verðlaunasjóði íslenskra barnabóka, established by the author Ármann Kr. Einarsson in conjunction with the publisher Vaka-Helgafell in 1985. The prize is awarded for an unpublished manuscript of a story for children and young people or for an illustrated children's book, published in the preceding year. The winning book is then published by Vaka-Helgafell (now part of Forlagið) during the autumn. On two occasions (1995 and 2006), two books have won the award.

Winners
 2017 - Elísa Jóhannsdóttir with Er ekki allt í lagi með þig? (What‘s Wrong With You?)
 2016 - Inga M. Beck with Skóladraugurinn (The School Ghost)
 2015 - Ragnheiður Eyjólfsdóttir with Skuggasaga – Arftakinn (A Story of Shadows – The Successor)
 2014 - Guðni Líndal Benediktsson with Leitin að Blóðey (The Search for Blood-Isle)
 2013 - No prize awarded because no entry was strong enough.
 2012 - Kjartan Yngvi Björnsson og Snæbjörn Brynjarsson, Hrafnsauga 
 2011 - Bryndís Björgvinsdóttir, Flugan sem stöðvaði stríðið
 2010 - Þorgrímur Þráinsson, Ertu Guð, afi?
 2009 - Guðmundur Brynjólfsson, Þvílík vika
 2008 - Gunnar Theodór Eggertsson, Steindýrin
 2007 - Hrund Þórsdóttir, Loforðið
 2006 - Margrét Tryggvadóttir og Halldór Baldursson, Sagan af undurfögru prinsessunni og hugrakka prinsinum hennar
 2006 - Héðinn Svarfdal Björnsson, Háski og hundakjöt
 2005 - No prize awarded because no entry was strong enough.
 2004 - Brynhildur Þórarinsdóttir, Leyndardómur ljónsins
 2003 - Yrsa Sigurðardóttir, Biobörn
 2002 - Harpa Jónsdóttir, Ferðin til Samiraka
 2001 - Gunnhildur Hrólfsdóttir, Sjáumst aftur...
 2000 - Ragnheiður Gestsdóttir, Leikur á borði
 1999 - No prize awarded because no entry was strong enough.
 1998 - Guðmundur Ólafsson, Heljarstökk afturábak
 1997 - Þorgrímur Þráinsson, Margt býr í myrkrinu
 1996 - Ingibjörg Möller, Grillaðir bananar
 1995 - Herdís Egilsdóttir, Veislan í barnavagninum
 1995 - Þórey Friðbjörnsdóttir, Eplasneplar
 1994 - Guðrún Hafdís Eiríksdóttir, Röndóttir spóar
 1993 - Elías Snæland Jónsson, Brak og brestir
 1992 - Friðrik Erlingsson, Benjamín dúfa
 1991 - Iðunn Steinsdóttir, Gegnum þyrnigerðið
 1990 - Karl Helgason, Í pokahorninu
 1989 - Heiður Baldursdóttir, Álagadalurinn
 1988 - Kristín Loftsdóttir, Fugl í búri
 1987 - Kristín Steinsdóttir, Franskbrauð með sultu
 1986 - Guðmundur Ólafsson, Emil og Skundi

See also
Nordic Council Children and Young People's Literature Prize
West Nordic Council's Children and Youth Literature Prize

Icelandic literary awards
Awards established in 1989
Fiction awards
Non-fiction literary awards